Daphne Laureola is a comic play by James Bridie about a young Polish refugee's infatuation with a middle-aged English woman. 'Egalitarianism is at the heart of this vision, but idealism may be just a liability.'

Productions
The play was first produced by the Old Vic at Wyndham's Theatre in London in 1949, starring Edith Evans and Peter Finch, under the management of Laurence Olivier. The production was a major success, helping launch Finch's career in London. In August 1950, it was performed at the Theatre Royal in Glasgow.

A 1950 Broadway production, also starring Evans, was less successful.

Original cast
Maisie MacArthur - Anna Turner
Bill Wishforth - Robin Lloyd
Helen Willis - Eileen O'Hara
Bob Kentish - Alexander Harris
George, the Waiter at Le Tois aux Porcs - Martin Miller
1st Spiv - Billy Thatcher
2nd Spiv - John Tore
Lady Pitts - Edith Evans
Ernest Piaste - Peter Finch
A Bored Woman - Anna Burden
A Bored Man - Ireland Wood
Mr. Gooch - Kenneth Hyde
Mr. Watson - Mark Stone
Vincent - Peter Williams
Sir Joseph Pitts - Felix Aylmer
The Manager of Le Toit aux Porcs - Bernard Gillman

Adaptations
It was adapted for television in the UK in 1958, In West Germany in 1962, in Australia in 1965 and in the UK again in 1978, starring Olivier.

References

External links
 
 

1949 plays
West End plays
Plays by James Bridie